Albert S. Humphrey (2 June 1926 – 31 October 2005) was an American business and management consultant who specialized in organizational management and cultural change. Initially earning degrees in chemical engineering in Illinois, he eventually moved to London.

Education 
Albert Humphrey was educated at the University of Illinois, where he graduated with a B.Sc. in chemical engineering. After this he gained a master's degree in chemical engineering at M.I.T. and an MBA at Harvard University.

Career 
Humphrey said that while he worked at the Stanford Research Institute (later SRI International), he was involved with the team that came up with the "International Executive Seminar in Business Planning", which became known as TAM (Team Action Management), and also with a team led by Robert Stewart, who published the SOFT framework (as Humphrey described it: "What is good in the present is Satisfactory, good in the future is an Opportunity; bad in the present is a Fault, and bad in the future is a Threat"). For a summary of the relationship of SOFT to SWOT analysis, see .

During his working life Humphrey acted as consultant to over 100 companies globally. In 2005 he was listed in:

 Who's Who in the World
 Debrett's People of Today
 Who's Who in the City
 The Directory of Directors

In 2004 he was listed in the Who's Who in Science and Engineering, 7th Edition (2003–2004).

References 

1926 births
2005 deaths
American business theorists
American management consultants
Harvard Business School alumni
MIT School of Engineering alumni
Grainger College of Engineering alumni
SRI International people